The 2019 Ken Galluccio Cup will be the 11th edition of the Ken Galluccio Cup, the European men's lacrosse club competition.

Competition format
The eight teams were divided into two groups of four, where the two first qualified teams joined the semifinals. Groups were drawn on 10 August 2019.

Group stage

Group A

Group B

Championship bracket

Fifth-position bracket

References

External links
Official website
Competition at Pointbench.com

Ken Galluccio Cup
Ken Galluccio Cup
Ken Galluccio Cup
Ken Galluccio Cup
Ken Galluccio Cup